Paul Arthur Garon (July 6, 1942 – July 26, 2022) was an American author, writer, and editor, noted for his meditations on surrealist works, and also a noted scholar on blues as a musical and cultural movement. 

Born in Louisville, Kentucky, the son of a doctor and a sociology graduate, Garon settled in Chicago and was one of the founders of the Chicago Surrealist Group in the mid-1960s.

Garon was one of the founding editors of Living Blues magazine in 1970.   He once wrote that "blues represents a fusion of music and poetry accomplished at a very high emotional temperature". Amongst his other publications, Garon was the biographer of Peetie Wheatstraw.  Later, Garon and his wife Beth operated Beasley Books together, a rare book business in Chicago. He was also a founding partner of the Chicago Rare Book Center, in Evanston, Illinois.

Garon died on July 26, 2022, at the age of 80.

Works
 What's the Use of Walking if There's A Freight Train Going Your Way? Black Hoboes and Their Songs. with Gene Tomko, 2015. 
 Woman With Guitar: Memphis Minnie's Blues, with Beth Garon, 1992. 
 Blues and the Poetic Spirit, 2001. 
 The Forecast Is Hot: Tracts & Other Collective Declarations of the Surrealist Movement in the United States 1966–1976, with Franklin Rosemont and Penelope Rosemont, 1997. 
 The Devil's Son-In-Law: The Story of Peetie Wheatstraw and His Songs, 2003. 
 Rana Mozelle: Surrealist Texts, 1978. 
 The Charles H. Kerr Company Archives 1885–1985: A Century of Socialist and Labor Publishing, 1985. 
 "White Blues," Race Traitor 4 (1995)

References

External links 
 
 Beasley Books
 

1942 births
2022 deaths
Writers from Louisville, Kentucky
American writers about music
American art critics
American book editors